José Morillo (born 28 May 1962) is a Spanish water polo player. He competed in the men's tournament at the 1984 Summer Olympics.

References

1962 births
Living people
Spanish male water polo players
Olympic water polo players of Spain
Water polo players at the 1984 Summer Olympics
Place of birth missing (living people)
20th-century Spanish people